Janibek Alimkhanuly (also spelled as Zhanibek Alimkhanuly, born 1 April 1993) is a Kazakhstani professional boxer who has held the WBO middleweight title since August 2022. As an amateur he won gold medals at the 2013 World Championships, 2013 Asian Championships and 2014 Asian Games. He also represented Kazakhstan at the 2016 Summer Olympics in the middleweight division, losing in the quarter-finals.

Early life
Alimkhanuly began boxing at the age of six because of his father and grandfather's love of the sport. His first fight was at six and he lost that match.

Professional career

Early career
Alimkhanuly made his professional debut against Milton Núñez, a former opponent of Alimkhanuly's fellow countryman Gennady Golovkin, on 29 October 2016 in his home city of Almaty, Kazakhstan. He won the bout via first-round technical knockout.

Ahead of his fight with Issah Samir on 21 March 2020, the world was struck with COVID-19. Alimkhanuly's fight was canceled but he said it's not a big deal that his bout was canceled and that there were more pressing concerns. "We just lost the fight date, someone lost the family. It’s not easy. We will fight when everything calms down but nobody will not return them to their family. I wish all patients a quick recovery.”

In his toughest test yet, Alimkhanuly faced former WBA (Regular) champion Rob Brant as the co-featured bout to Vasyl Lomachenko vs. Masayoshi Nakatani on 26 June 2021 in Paradise, Nevada. He knocked Brant down in the sixth round en route to an eighth-round corner retirement victory.

Alimkhanuly faced the former two-time world middleweight champion Hassan N'Dam N'Jikam on 20 November 2021, on the Terence Crawford vs. Shawn Porter undercard. He won the fight by an eight-round technical knockout. Alimkhanuly was ahead on the scorecards at the time of the stoppage (with scores of 70–62, 70–62 and 70–61) and had knocked N'Jikam down in the third round.

WBO middleweight champion

Alimkhanuly vs. Dignum
On 30 November 2021, the WBO ordered their middleweight champion Demetrius Andrade to make a mandatory title defense against Alimkhanuly. Six months later, on 21 March 2022, the sanctioning body allowed Andrade to move up in weight and face Zach Parker for the interim super middleweight title instead, while allowing him to keep the middleweight championship as well. Andrade later withdrew from the fight, as he suffered a right shoulder injury during training camp. As such, Alimkhanuly faced the undefeated Danny Dignum for the vacant WBO interim middleweight title on 21 May 2022, in the main event of an ESPN broadcast card, which took place at the Resorts World Event Center in Las Vegas, Nevada. He made quick work of his opponent, stopping Dignum with an uppercut near the end of the second round. Alimkhanuly landed 21 of 33 power punches and 34 of 94 overall, while Dignum managed to land only 6 out of 45 total punches. 

On 20 July 2022, the WBO once again ordered their Demetrius Andrade to defend his title against Alimkhanuly, giving the pair 30 days to come to terms. Andrade officially vacated his middleweight title on 30 August. Alimkhanuly was promoted to the WBO Champion that same day.

Alimkhanuly vs. Bentley
On 22 September 2022, it was revealed that Alimkhanuly would make a voluntary title defense against the #14 ranked WBO middleweight contender Denzel Bentley. The title bout was booked as the headliner of an ESPN+ broadcast card, which took place at the Palms Casino Resort in Las Vegas, Nevada on November 12, 2022. Alimkhanuly retained his title by unanimous decision, with two judges scoring the bout 116–112 in his favor, while the third judge awarded him a wider scorecard of 118–110. He outlanded Bentley 187 to 159 in total punches and 137 to 125 in power punches, landing 35% of all the strikes he threw, compared to Bentley's 25.9%.

Second title defense
On 20 November 2022, the WBO formally ordered Alimkhanuly to make a mandatory title defense against the former junior middleweight champion Jaime Munguia. On 2 December, it was revealed that Munguia’s team had declined to proceed with the mandatory title fight. On 22 February 2023, Alimkhanuly was ordered to make a mandatory title defense against the former WBO light-middleweight champion Liam Smith.

Personal life
Alimkhanuly is an avid reader. He enjoys books on nutrition. He is also learning the English language.

Professional boxing record

See also
List of world middleweight boxing champions

References

External links

|-

1993 births
Living people
Kazakhstani male boxers
Medalists at the 2014 Asian Games
Asian Games medalists in boxing
Asian Games gold medalists for Kazakhstan
Boxers at the 2014 Asian Games
AIBA World Boxing Championships medalists
Olympic boxers of Kazakhstan
Boxers at the 2016 Summer Olympics
World middleweight boxing champions
World Boxing Organization champions